The Serrasalmidae (serrasalmids) are a family of characiform fishes, recently elevated to family status. It includes more than 90 species. The name means "serrated salmon family", which refers to the serrated keel running along the belly of these fish. Fish classified as Serrasalmidae are also known by these common names: pacu, piranha, and silver dollar. These common names generally designate differing dental characteristics and feeding habits.

Description
Most species also possess an anteriorly directed spine just before the dorsal fin extending from a supraneural bone; exceptions include members of the genera Colossoma, Piaractus, and Mylossoma.

Most serrasalmids have about 60 chromosomes, ranging from 54 to 62.Metynnis has 62 chromosomes, as does Catoprion, Pristobrycon striolatus, and Pygopristis.

Distribution
Serrasalmids inhabit all major and some minor Atlantic river systems in South America east of the Andes, but have been introduced to other areas. Species range from about 10°N latitude south to about 35°S latitude.

Ecology
The diets of the various serrasalmid fishes include seeds, fruits, leaves, and various invertebrate and vertebrate prey, as well as fish flesh, scales, and fins. To emphasize the diversity of diets, authors commonly highlight the fruit- and leaf-eating pacus and the highly carnivorous piranhas. Most in the family other than piranhas are primarily herbivorous. In contrast, piranhas have been long believed to be strict carnivores. Many species change diets depending on age and resource availability.

The primarily carnivorous piranha group comprises the genera Catoprion, Pristobrycon, Pygocentrus, Pygopristis and Serrasalmus, but based on phylogeny also the mainly herbivorous (although with omnivorous tendencies) Metynnis. The remaining primarily herbivorous species can be divided into two groups based on ecology and, to some extent, phylogeny: Colossoma, Mylossoma and Piaractus are mainly found in relatively slow-moving waters, and feed extensively on fruits, nuts and seeds, playing an important role as seed dispersers. Mylesinus, Myleus,  Ossubtus, Tometes and Utiaritichthys are found in fast-flowing sections of rivers, and mainly feed on aquatic plants, especially Podostemaceae. Myloplus mostly feed on plant material and some of its species are phylogenetically related with the previous group, but this genus includes species of both slow and fast-flowing waters.

Taxonomy
The Serrasalmidae were recently classified as a subfamily of the Characidae.  Their relationship to other characiforms has yet to be determined. The taxonomy and systematics of piranhas and their relatives are complicated and much remains unsettled. Consequently, both species identification and phylogenetic placement of many taxa are problematic.

However, the ongoing classification of these fish is difficult and often contentious, with ichthyologists basing ranks according to characteristics that may overlap irregularly (see Cladistics). Ultimately, classifications can be rather arbitrary.

Despite this, the Serrasalmidae are relatively well understood, and agreement is wide on the genera and species included.

Fossil record
The fossil record, particularly for piranhas, is relatively sparse. Most known fossils are from the Miocene, although a few unidentified forms are considered Paleocene and two reportedly date to as early as the Late Cretaceous. Fossils of a living species of Colossoma from the Miocene have been described, suggesting a very conservative history for a specialized herbivorous fish. All serrasalmine genera had originated by the middle Miocene, with the possible exception of three of the four piranha genera (Pygocentrus, Pristobrycon, and Serrasalmus).

Relationship to humans
Many serrasalmids are in demand as aquarium ornamentals, and several pacus, such as Piaractus and Colossoma, are economically important to commercial fisheries and aquaculture.

Piranhas are generally less valued, although they are commonly consumed by subsistence fishers and frequently sold for food in local markets. A few piranha species occasionally appear in the aquarium trade, and, in recent decades, dried specimens have been marketed as tourist souvenirs. Piranhas occasionally bite and sometimes injure bathers and swimmers, but serious attacks are rare and the threat to humans has been exaggerated. However, piranhas are a considerable nuisance to commercial and sport fishers because they steal bait, mutilate catch, damage nets and other gear, and may bite when handled.

References

 
Fish of South America
Extant Miocene first appearances
Ray-finned fish families

ka:პირანიასებრნი